The 1999 Fareham Council election took place on 6 May 1999 to elect members of Fareham Borough Council in Hampshire, England. One third of the council was up for election and the Conservative party gained overall control of the council from no overall control.

After the election, the composition of the council was
Conservative 21
Liberal Democrat 14
Labour 5
Others 2

Election result
The results saw the Conservatives take control of the council after winning 9 seats.

Ward results

References

1999
1999 English local elections
1990s in Hampshire